Chrotichthys is an extinct genus of prehistoric bony fish that lived in the Induan stage of the Early Triassic epoch.

See also

 Prehistoric fish
 List of prehistoric bony fish

References

Early Triassic fish
Prehistoric neopterygii